West Sabine Independent School District is a public school district based in Pineland, Texas (USA) that serves western Sabine County.  The district was formed in 1962 by the consolidation of Bronson and Pineland school districts.

In 2009, the school district was rated "academically acceptable" by the Texas Education Agency.

Schools
West Sabine High School (Grades 6-12)
West Sabine Elementary School (Grades PK-5)

References

External links
West Sabine ISD

School districts in Sabine County, Texas
1962 establishments in Texas